Wendy Spero is an actress, comedian, and writer who has performed on NPR, Comedy Central, VH1, NBC, and the Food Network. Her one woman show, "Who's Your Daddy?" was produced at Edinburgh Fringe Festival after a year-long run at the Upright Citizens Brigade Theater in New York in 2004.  She wrote a memoir, Microthrills: True Stories from a Life of Small Highs, in 2006.

References

External links
Official homepage

Doing comedy at Googleplex
Wendy Spero on Comedy Central
Rachel Kramer Bussel interviews Wendy Spero for Small Spiral Notebook
Interview with Robert Lee, Collective, BBC, 2004

21st-century American comedians
Year of birth missing (living people)
Living people
Wesleyan University alumni
Place of birth missing (living people)